Hobbs Glacier may refer to:

Hobbs Glacier (James Ross Island), Antarctica
Hobbs Glacier (Victoria Land), Antarctica
Hobbs Glacier (New Zealand)